Marcia Lauter Obrasky Levin (1918–2006) was a popular children's book author, using the pen name of Marcia Martin, creator of the Donna Parker series, as well as 22 books for beginning readers, and some of the first enrichment text books in the New Mathematics, she was born and raised in Philadelphia, and lived in Rye, New York for 56 years.

Bibliography (partial)

Donna Parker Series
 Donna Parker, Special Agent (Whitman Books, 1957 - )
 Donna Parker on Her Own (Whitman Books, 1957)
 Donna Parker: A Spring to Remember (Whitman Books, 1960)
 Donna Parker at Cherrydale (World Distributors, 1961)
 Donna Parker in Hollywood (Whitman Books, 1961)
 Donna Parker Mystery at Arawak (Whitman Books, 1962)
 Donna Parker Takes a Giant Step (Whitman Books, 1964)

Tom Corbett Series 
 Tom Corbett's A Trip to the Moon (Wonder Books, 1953)
 Tom Corbett's Wonder Book of Space (Wonder Books, 1953)

Classics Retold 
 Anna Sewell's Black Beauty Retold For Little Children (Wonder Books, 1952)
 Peter Pan (Wonder Books, 1952) (illustrated by Beatrice Derwinski)
 Adventures From the Original Alice in Wonderland (Wonder Books, 1978)

The Merry Mailman Series 
 The Merry Mailman (Treasure Books, 1953)
 The Merry Mailman Around the World (Treasure Books, 1955)

Mathematics 
 Mathematics Illustrated Dictionary: Facts, Figures and People, Including the New Mathematics by Jeanne Bendick, Marcia Levin, Leonard Simon, Margaret Pickard. (Kaye & Ward Limited)
 New mathematics practice workbook  Marcia Levin & Jeanne Bendick. Illustrated by Jeanne Bendick. (Grosset & Dunlap, 1966)

Other Books 
 A Little Cowboy's Christmas (Wonder Books, 1951)
 How the Clown Got His Smile (Wonder Books, 1951)
 Sonny the Lucky Bunny (World Distributors, 1952) (illustrated by Art Seiden)
 Waiting for Santa Claus: Christmas is coming (Wonder Books, 1952)
 Let's Take a Ride (Treasure Books, 1953)
 Johnny Grows Up (Wonder Books, 1954)

External links
Obituary on official website

1918 births
2006 deaths
American children's writers
Writers from Philadelphia
American women children's writers
20th-century American women
20th-century American people
21st-century American women